The Metro Atlantic Athletic Conference (MAAC) is a collegiate athletic conference affiliated with NCAA Division I. Of its current 11 full members, 10 are located in three states of the northeastern United States: Connecticut, New Jersey, and New York. The other member is in Maryland.

Members are all relatively small private institutions, a majority Catholic or formerly Catholic, with the only exceptions being two secular institutions: Rider University and Quinnipiac University.

The MAAC currently sponsors 25 sports and has 17 associate member institutions.

History

The conference was founded in 1980 by six charter members: the U.S. Military Academy, Fairfield University, Fordham University, Iona College, Manhattan College, and Saint Peter's College. Competition officially began the next year, in the sports of men's cross-country and men's soccer.

Competition in men's and women's basketball began in the 1981–1982 season. In 1982, Saint Peter's was the first women's team to represent the MAAC in the NCAA women's basketball tournament. In 1984, the MAAC received an automatic bid to the NCAA men's basketball tournament, where Iona was the first team to represent the MAAC on the men's side.

The conference currently possesses 15 automatic bids to NCAA championships. In 2012–13, the MAAC became eligible for its 15th NCAA championship automatic bid when women's rowing fulfilled the qualifying requirements.

The league added football in 1993, but discontinued it following the 2007 season.

From 1997 to 2003, the MAAC sponsored ice hockey. At that time, the hockey league split from the MAAC and changed its name to Atlantic Hockey. Also, Marist College and Rider University moved the majority of their intercollegiate athletic programs to the MAAC in 1997 with the intent that the MAAC would enhance media exposure and competition for their men's and women's Division I basketball programs.

In September 2011, the conference announced the launch of MAAC.TV, the league's first broadband network.

In March 2012, for the first time in 16 years, the MAAC had two teams advance to the NCAA Division I men's basketball tournament, with Loyola earning the league's automatic bid and Iona garnering an at-large bid.

In July 2013, Quinnipiac University and Monmouth University joined the MAAC to replace Loyola University Maryland, departing to the Patriot League. Also in 2013, the MAAC announced that it would add field hockey with league play set to begin in the 2013–14 academic year. However, field hockey was dropped after the 2018 season. The MAAC field hockey league was effectively taken over by the Northeast Conference (NEC), which reinstated the sport the following year. The conference decided to no longer host a conference championship for men's rowing after the 2016 season, which is governed by the Intercollegiate Rowing Association.

On January 25, 2022, Monmouth announced it was leaving the MAAC after the 2021–22 school year to join the Colonial Athletic Association. The MAAC responded by entering into negotiations with Mount St. Mary's University, a full but non-football NEC member. ESPN reported on April 27, 2022 that the addition of Mount St. Mary's for 2022–23 and beyond would be finalized in early May. The last of these developments came shortly after the MAAC's greatest success in men's basketball, when Saint Peter's became the first 15-seed ever to reach an NCAA regional final, losing there to North Carolina. Mount St. Mary's would be confirmed as Monmouth's replacement on May 2.

Also in 2022, four schools that were already MAAC affiliates added men's lacrosse to their MAAC memberships. All are full members of conferences that dropped the sport following the addition of men's lacrosse by the Atlantic 10 Conference. LIU, Sacred Heart, and Wagner are members of the Northeast Conference, and VMI is a member of the Southern Conference. LIU is the only one of the four that had not previously housed men's lacrosse in the MAAC.

Over the conference's history, MAAC teams have achieved national acclaim in many sports. In the summer of 2002, the Marist men's varsity eight boat advanced to the semifinals of the Temple Challenge Cup at the Henley Royal Regatta. In 2007, the Marist women's basketball team advanced to the Sweet 16 of the NCAA Division I women's basketball tournament. The Red Foxes have recorded five NCAA wins since their run in 2007. In the fall of 2011, the Iona men's cross country team finished tied for ninth place at the NCAA Championship race, extending the Gaels' streak to 10 straight Top 10 national finishes. In basketball, MAAC teams have made a total of 80 NIT appearances and 50 NCAA basketball tournament appearances.

Notable MAAC student athletes include Mary Beth Riley, a 1991 graduate of Canisius, who was the first recipient of the NCAA Woman of the Year Award and Erin Whalen, a member of the Iona women's rowing team who in the fall of 1998 was awarded one of the nation's 32 Rhodes Scholarships for academic achievement and civic leadership.

Member institutions

Full members

Current
The MAAC has eleven member institutions.

Associate members
Departing members are in red.

Notes

Former

Full

Associate

Notes

Membership timeline

Sports

The Metro Atlantic Athletic Conference sponsors championship competition in 10 men's and 13 women's NCAA sanctioned sports, plus two sports not organized by the NCAA—esports, which are fully coeducational, and men's rowing.

Men's
Departing member Monmouth in pink.

Notes

Unsponsored

Women's

Unsponsored 

Notes

Facilities

Basketball

Men's

Notes

MAAC men's basketball conference tournament locations

Postseason history

NCAA tournament at-large bids

In 2012, Iona, who was inspired by one of their all around best players Sean Armand, which had lost in the semifinals of that year's MAAC tournament, received an NCAA at-large tournament bid.  This was the second time the conference was awarded multiple men's NCAA bids.

After St. Peter's won the 1995 MAAC tournament, the NCAA men's basketball tournament selection committee awarded Manhattan College an at large bid. The Jaspers proved the committee correct by defeating Oklahoma in the first round.

The same first-round success Manhattan enjoyed in the 1995 NCAA tournament could not be matched by Iona.  In the 2012 NCAAs, the Gaels unexpectedly relinquished a 25-point, first-half lead to the BYU Cougars, falling 78–72 in Dayton, Ohio.  Further, Iona's offense, the highest-scoring (per game) in the nation, managed just 17 points in the second half of that upset.

It was the largest comeback in NCAA tournament history, besting the 22-point hole the Duke Blue Devils rallied from to defeat the Maryland Terrapins in the Final Four of the 2001 NCAA tournament.

Women's

Notes

Postseason history

Baseball

Soccer

Men's 

^ Tournament delayed until April 2021 due to Covid

Women's

^ Tournament delayed until April 2021 due to Covid

Lacrosse

Swimming and diving

Conference champions

Cross country

Champions

Football
The MAAC Football League was formed before the 1993 season, but it was discontinued following the 2007 season.

At its peak in 1997, it consisted of 10 teams:

Canisius (1993-2002, discontinued football after 2002 season)
Duquesne (1994-2007, joined Northeast Conference after 2007 season)
Fairfield (1996-2002, discontinued football after 2002 season)
Georgetown (1993-1999, joined Patriot League after 1999 season)
Iona (1993-2007, became independent, discontinued football after 2008 season)
La Salle (1997-2007, discontinued football after 2007 season)
Marist (1994-2007, became independent, joined Pioneer Football League after 2008 season)
St. John's (1993-1997, became independent, joined Northeast Conference after 1999 season, discontinued football after 2002 season)
Saint Peter's (1993-2006, discontinued football after 2006 season)
Siena (1993-2003, discontinued football after 2003 season)

Champions
1993 Iona (5-0-0)
1994 Marist (6-1) & St. John's (6-1)
1995 Duquesne (7-0)
1996 Duquesne (8-0)
1997 Georgetown (7-0)
1998 Fairfield (6-1) & Georgetown (6-1)
1999 Duquesne (7-1)
2000 Duquesne (7-0)
2001 Duquesne (6-0)
2002 Duquesne (8-0)
2003 Duquesne (5-0)
2004 Duquesne (4-0)
2005 Duquesne (4-0)
2006 Duquesne (3-1) & Marist (3-1)
2007 Duquesne, Iona & Marist (all 2-1)

Notable sports figures

Some of the notable sport figures who played collegiately and/or graduated from a MAAC school, include:

Baseball

Jack Armstrong, former MLB pitcher; 1990 MLB All-Star and World Champion (Rider)
John Axford, current relief pitcher for Los Angeles Dodgers (Canisius)
Kevin Barry, former MLB pitcher (Rider)
Shad Barry, former MLB player (Niagara)
Chris Begg, pitcher for Team Canada at the 2004 Summer Olympics and World Baseball Classic (Niagara)
Brad Brach, current relief pitcher for Atlanta Braves (Monmouth)
Frank Brooks, former MLB relief pitcher (Saint Peter's)
Frank Cashen, former General Manager of the Baltimore Orioles and 1986 World Series Champion New York Mets (Loyola)
Keefe Cato, former MLB pitcher (Fairfield)
Tim Christman, former MLB relief pitcher (Siena)
Harry Croft, former MLB player (Niagara)
Pete Harnisch, MLB All-Star Pitcher (Fordham)
Billy Harrell, former MLB infielder (Siena)
Jim Hoey, former MLB relief pitcher (Rider)
Gary Holle, former MLB first baseman (Siena)
Miguel Jimenez, former MLB pitcher (Fordham)
Jeff Kunkel, former MLB player; 3rd overall pick of the 1983 MLB Draft by the Texas Rangers (Rider)
Sal Maglie, former starting pitcher (Niagara)
Nick Margevicius, current starting pitcher for Seattle Mariners (Rider)
Joe McCarthy, former MLB catcher (Niagara)
Rinty Monahan, former MLB player (Niagara)
Ray Montgomery, former MLB player (Fordham)
Danny Napoleon, former MLB outfielder (Rider)
Mike Parisi, former MLB pitcher (Manhattan)
Victor Santos, former MLB relief pitcher (Saint Peter's)
Chuck Schilling, former MLB second baseman (Manhattan)
Tom Waddell, former MLB pitcher (Manhattan)

Basketball

Joe Arlauckas, former NBA player (Niagara)
John Beilein, former head coach of Cleveland Cavaliers and Michigan men's basketball (Canisius)
Matt Brady, current Maryland assistant coach, former head coach of James Madison men's basketball (Siena)
Steve Burtt, Sr., former NBA player (Iona)
Al Butler, former NBA player (Niagara)
Keydren Clark, two-time NCAA scoring leader; seventh all-time NCAA scoring leader (Saint Peter's)
Larry Costello, former NBA player and coach; six-time NBA All-Star (Niagara)
Joe DeSantis, former men's college basketball coach; 1979 NCAA All-American (Fairfield)
 Doug Edert, breakout star of Saint Peter's 2022 NCAA tournament run
Kathy Fedorjaka, former Bucknell women's basketball coach (Fairfield)
Luis Flores, former NBA player (Manhattan)
Greg Francis, current Alberta men's basketball coach; former Canadian Olympic basketball player (Fairfield)
Deng Gai, former NBA player; 2006 NCAA block shot leader (Fairfield)
Sean Green, former NBA player (Iona)
Kenny Hasbrouck, former NBA player (Siena)
Bobby Joe Hatton – former professional basketball player; member of the Puerto Rico national basketball team at the 2004 Olympic Games (Marist)
Stella Johnson, professional basketball player, drafted by Phoenix Mercury in 2020, played for Chicago Sky and Washington Mystics (Rider)
Jared Jordan, professional basketball player in Europe, drafted by Los Angeles Clippers in 2007 (Marist)
Frank Layden, former NBA coach and executive; NBA Coach of the Year and Executive of the Year (Niagara)
Manny Leaks, former NBA player (Niagara)
Tim Legler, former NBA player; current ESPN analyst (La Salle)
Ralph Lewis, former NBA player (La Salle)
Bob MacKinnon, former NBA Head Coach and General Manager of the New Jersey Nets (Canisius)
Johnny McCarthy, member of the 1963–64 NBA Champion Boston Celtics and first of just three players in NBA history to record a triple-double in a playoff debut (Canisius)
Brendan Malone, former NBA head coach (Iona)
Michael Meeks, former Canadian Olympic basketball player (Canisius)
Juan Mendez, professional basketball player in Europe; highest scoring Canadian in Division I men's basketball history (Niagara)
Mike Morrison, former NBA player (Loyola)
 KC Ndefo, another key figure in Saint Peter's 2022 NCAA run
Dan O'Sullivan, former NBA player (Fordham)
Tim O'Toole, current ESPN analyst; former men's college basketball coach (Fairfield)
Doug Overton, former NBA player (La Salle)
Digger Phelps, current ESPN analyst; former men's college basketball coach (Rider)
Darren Phillip, 2000 NCAA Top Rebounder (Fairfield)
Rick Pych, current San Antonio Spurs executive (Fairfield)
Jeff Ruland, former NBA player (Iona)
Lionel Simmons, former NBA player (La Salle)
Mike Smrek, former NBA player (Canisius)
Jason Thompson, former Sacramento Kings lottery draft pick, former Toronto Raptors and Golden State Warriors forward (Rider)
Edwin Ubiles former NBA player (Siena)
Randy Woods, former NBA player (La Salle)
A. J. Wynder, former NBA player (Fairfield)

Soccer

Jose Aguinaga, New York Red Bulls draft pick, former USL forward (Rider)
Abby Allan, New Zealand women's national football team (Fairfield)
Jamie Darvill, USL-2 player (Loyola)
Anthony Di Biase, USL-2 player (Niagara)
Bryan Harkin, USL-2 player (Fairfield)
Christof Lindenmayer, former MLS player (Loyola)
Mark Longwell, former U.S. National and NASL defender (Fairfield)
Brett Maron, current player in Sweden, Goalkeeper (Fairfield)
Jim McElderry, current Rutgers men's soccer coach and former Fordham men's soccer coach (Fairfield)
Jim McKeown, former NASL defender (Rider)
Tennant McVea, current USL League Two player and associate head coach for Old Dominion men's soccer, former Finnish Premier Division player (Loyola)
Michael O'Keeffe, New Zealand national football team (Fairfield)
Bobby Smith, National Soccer Hall of Fame member; former U.S. National and NASL defender (Rider)
Matt Turner, New England Revolution and USMNT goalkeeper (Fairfield)
Florian Valot, currently plays for Miami FC in USL, former player for New York Red Bulls and FC Cincinnati, midfielder/forward (Rider)
Murphy Wiredu, former S. League player (Saint Peter's)
Dennis Wit, former U.S. National and NASL player (Loyola)
Jordan Scarlett, Tampa Bay Rowdies, drafted by New York Red Bulls, Defender (Iona)
Ignacio Maganto, current player for Union Adarve in Tercera Division in Spain, drafted by Los Angeles Galaxy, Midfielder (Iona)

References

External links
 

 
Northeastern United States
Sports in the Eastern United States
Sports leagues established in 1980
Organizations established in 1980
Articles which contain graphical timelines
1980 establishments in the United States